Wladyslaw Jurijowytsch Trojizky (scientific transliteration ; also Vladislav Troitsky, or Vlad Troitsky, as his name is most often spelled in Western Europe; born November 26, 1964, in Ulan-Ude, Buryat ASSR) is a Ukrainian theater actor, theater director, dramaturge and radio host of Russian descent, who has received the Shevchenko National Prize for his requiem opera IYOV (Hiob) in 2020.

Biography 
Vladislav Troitsky was born in the capital of the south-eastern ASSR Buryatia. He moved with his parents into Ukraine at age eleven, where he graduated in 1987 from the Igor Sikorsky Kyiv Polytechnic Institute in radio engineering. In 1990 he concluded his aspirantur there, too, and in 2002 graduated from a course of studies in directing and acting art at the Russian Institute of Theatre Arts. Subsequently he taught at the national cinema and television university Karpenko-Karyj in Kyiv from 2003 to 2006. Troitsky lives and works in Kyiv.

Work 
Starting in the middle of the 1990s, Troitsky was active in the independent theatre and music scene and has left enduring marks with his creations:
 1994: Foundation of the Dakh theatre, the first independent theatre in Ukraine
 2004: Foundation of the ethno-chaos-group DakhaBrakha
 2007: Foundation of the Gogolfest
 2012: Foundation of the Dakh Daughters Freak Cabarets
 2015: Production of the IYOV-Opera-Requiem in the context of the project "Nova Opera", together with Roman Hryhoriv and Ilja Rasumejko

Dramaturgical works led Troitsky repeatedly abroad, first to Hungary in 2005, later into Switzerland, Poland and in 2017 to Germany, where he successfully performed in Magdeburg with two productions: Das Mädchen mit den Streichhölzern (the girl with the matches) by Ukrainian author Klim and Dostoevsky's The Village of Stepanchikovo and Its Inhabitants.

Troitsky cooperates especially closely with Wladimir Alekseewic Klim (Klimenko), a playwright, director and dramaturge born in Lviv Oblast.

Honours 
 2001 and 2002: Київська пектораль (Kyiv pectoral)
 2014: Merited agent of art of Ukraine
 2018: Officer of the order of arts and literature 
 2019: Wassyl Stus Award
 2020: Shevchenko National Prize, category theatre

Interviews (selected) 
 Vlad Troitsky: "Ich war verrückt" (I was crazy), interview with Vanessa Weiss

References 
 Maria Sonevytsky: Wild music: sound and sovereignty in Ukraine. Middletown, Conn., 2019.

Ukrainian male stage actors
Ukrainian theatre directors
Ukrainian opera directors
Ukrainian performance artists
21st-century Ukrainian male actors
21st-century Ukrainian male artists
Recipients of the Shevchenko National Prize
1964 births
Living people